Wellatota is a village in Sri Lanka. It is located within Central Province. Wellatota is approximately 113 kilometers away from the Sri Lankan Capital, Colombo.

See also
List of towns in Central Province, Sri Lanka

References

External links

Populated places in Central Province, Sri Lanka